
Year 523 (DXXIII) was a common year starting on Sunday (link will display the full calendar) of the Julian calendar. At the time, it was known as the Year of the Consulship of Maximus without colleague (or, less frequently, year 1276 Ab urbe condita). The denomination 523 for this year has been used since the early medieval period, when the Anno Domini calendar era became the prevalent method in Europe for naming years.

Events 
 By place 
 Byzantine Empire 
 Justinian, later Byzantine emperor, marries in Constantinople his mistress Theodora, who is by profession  a courtesan (approximate date).

 Europe 
 King Chlothar I takes part in an expedition against Burgundy and captures the town of Autun. Now about 26, he makes plans to expand the territory he inherited from his late father, Clovis I. 
 King Sigismund of Burgundy is defeated by the invading Franks under Chlodomer, Childebert I and Chlothar I. He is captured and taken as prisoner to Aurelianum (modern Orléans).

 Africa 
 
 Hilderic succeeds his uncle Thrasamund after a 27-year reign, and becomes king of the Vandals and Alans. He favours Catholicism and grants the inhabitants religious freedom.
 Leptis Magna (modern Libya) is sacked by Berber (Moor) raiders. Gelimer leads a successful expedition in North Africa.

 Asia 
 A revolt breaks out on the Six Frontier Towns, on the northern border of Northern Wei China ("Revolt of the Six Garrisons"). Tensions between the elite and the Tuoba-clan severely destabilise the state.
 The Songyue Pagoda is completed during the Northern Wei era; the circular-based tower is still 40 m (131 ft) in height.
 Seong becomes king of Baekje, one of the Three Kingdoms of Korea.

 By topic 
 Religion 
 August 6 – Pope Hormisdas dies at Rome after a 9-year reign, in which he has been instrumental in ending the Acacian Schism. He is succeeded by John I as the 53rd pope.

Births 
 Aurelianus, archbishop of Arles (d. 551)

Deaths 
 August 6 – Pope Hormisdas (b. 450)
 Arethas, leader of the Christian community in Yemen
 Muryeong, king of Baekje (Three Kingdoms of Korea)
 Philoxenus of Mabbug, Syrian theologian
 Thrasamund, king of the Vandals (b. 450)

References